A caudex (plural: caudices) of a plant is a stem, but the term is also used to mean a rootstock and particularly a basal stem structure from which new growth arises.

In the strict sense of the term, meaning a stem, "caudex" is most often used with plants that have a different stem morphology from the typical angiosperm dicotyledon stem: examples of this include palms, ferns, and cycads.

The related term caudiciform, literally meaning stem-like, is sometimes used to mean pachycaul, thick-stemmed.

Etymology 
The term is from the Latin caudex, a noun meaning "tree trunk".

See also
 Stipe

References

External links 

Bihrmann's Caudiciforms Extensive listing of caudiciforms, images for most species
Wayne's Word  Caudiciform Plants With An Enlarged Caudex

Plant morphology
Plant anatomy